Associação Desportiva Ferroviária Vale do Rio Doce, usually known as Desportiva Ferroviária, or simply as Desportiva (or as Desportiva-ES), is a traditional Brazilian football club from Cariacica, Espírito Santo state.

Desportiva is currently ranked eighth among Espírito Santo teams in CBF's national club ranking, at 222nd place overall.

History
On July 7, 1963, the club was founded as Associação Desportiva Ferroviária Vale do Rio Doce, after Vale do Rio Doce, Ferroviário-ES, Cauê, Guarany-ES, Valeriodoce-ES and Cruzeiro-ES fused. These clubs were formed by Companhia Vale do Rio Doce railway employees. Companhia Vale do Rio Doce encouraged the clubs' fusion.

In 1964, the club won its first professional title, the Campeonato Capixaba.

In 1974, Desportiva competed in the Série A for the first time. The club finished in the 34th position.

In 1980, the club competed again in the Campeonato Brasileiro Série A, finishing in the 15th place. That was the club's all-time best campaign in the competition.

In 1993, Desportiva competed in the Série A for the last time. The club finished in the 29th position.

On April 19, 1999, the club became a private company, and changed its name to Desportiva Capixaba. The senior partner was Frannel Distribuidora de Combustível, later replaced by Grupo Villa-Forte due to Frannel's bankruptcy.

In November 2010, former soccer player Robson Santana was elected by club members as president and a new direction was established in the club.

On April 8, 2011, the club was renamed back to Associação Desportiva Ferroviária Vale do Rio Doce.

In 2013, Desportiva Capixaba won its last title, the Campeonato Capixaba, after beating Aracruz in the final.

Achievements
 Campeonato Capixaba:
 Winners (18): 1964, 1965, 1967, 1972, 1974, 1977, 1979, 1980, 1981, 1984, 1986, 1989, 1992, 1994, 1996, 2000, 2013, 2016
 Copa Espírito Santo:
 Winners (2): 2008, 2012
 Campeonato Capixaba Second Level:
 Winners (2): 2007, 2012
 Taça Cidade de Vitória:
 Winners (1): 1966, 1968
 Torneio Ínicio:
 Winners (1): 1967

Stadium
Desportiva Ferroviária's home stadium is Engenheiro Alencar Araripe stadium, inaugurated in 1966, with a maximum capacity of 22,600 people.

Club colors
The club's colors are grenadine red and white. The club's home kit is composed of grenadine red shirts with white details, grenadine red shorts and white socks.

Mascot
Desportiva Ferroviária's mascot is a locomotive sharing the club's colors.

References

External links
 / Official site
 Desportiva Ferroviária at Arquivo de Clubes

 
Association football clubs established in 1963
1963 establishments in Brazil
Football clubs in Espírito Santo